Moon Gold is the debut studio album released by Japanese alternative rock band the Pillows, released on June 21, 1991. It is the band's first full-length record.

Track listing
 "You Are" (キミがいる) – 4:02
 "This Is My Fashion" – 2:36
 "I Need Somebody" – 4:33
 "Dear, My 'First' Step" – 5:00
 "I Feels Like It's Gonna Rain" (雨が降ってきたような気がする) – 4:08
 "If You Sing in the Rain" (雨にうたえば) – 4:44
 "Kiss Me Baby" – 2:46
 "I Want to Return There" (あそこへ帰りたい) – 3:18
 "Hello Girl" (ハローガール) – 4:15
 "Foreigner" – 3:20
 "Want to Sleep For..." – 3:27
 "Good-bye Third Planet" (さようなら第三惑星) – 5:18

1991 debut albums
The Pillows albums
Pony Canyon albums